Northwood is a census-designated place in Snyder Township, Blair County, Pennsylvania, United States.  It is located near I-99 and is very close to the borough of Tyrone.  As of the 2010 census, the population was 296  residents.

Demographics

References

Census-designated places in Blair County, Pennsylvania
Census-designated places in Pennsylvania